Pleurodema cinereum is a species of frog in the family Leptodactylidae. It is found in the Andes in northwestern Argentina, Bolivia, and southeastern Peru. Its common name is Juliaca four-eyed frog, after its type locality, Juliaca. Pleurodema borellii is possibly a junior synonym of this species.

Its natural habitats are open montane puna grasslands and semi-deciduous forests. Reproduction takes place in small permanent and temporary pools where pairs build floating foam nests. It is a common species facing no major threats.

References

Pleurodema
Amphibians of the Andes
Amphibians of Argentina
Amphibians of Bolivia
Amphibians of Peru
Taxonomy articles created by Polbot
Amphibians described in 1878